Mount Vernon is an unincorporated community in Waltz Township, Wabash County, in the U.S. state of Indiana.

It is located next to the town of Somerset.

Geography

References

Unincorporated communities in Wabash County, Indiana
Unincorporated communities in Indiana